John M. McSweeney (March 26, 1923 - March 18, 1995) was an American politician from Maine. McSweeney, a Democrat from Old Orchard Beach, Maine, served in the Maine House of Representatives from 1979 to 1990.

References

1923 births
1995 deaths
People from Old Orchard Beach, Maine
Democratic Party members of the Maine House of Representatives
20th-century American politicians